is a Shingon-sect Buddhist temple in the Sowamachi neighborhood of the city of Takayama, Gifu, Japan. It is one of the few surviving provincial temples established by Emperor Shōmu during the Nara period (710 – 794). Due to this connection, the foundation stones of the Nara period pagoda located on temple grounds were designated as a National Historic Site in 1929.

History

The Hida Kokubun-ji is located in downtown Takayama, a short distance from Takayama Station. The exact date of construction is believed to be around 757, over 15 years from the foundation of the provincial temple system in 741. The temple claims that it was founded by the famed wandering prelate Gyōki without any historical evidence. However, records indicate that the original temple burned down in 819 and was rebuilt in 855. The existing Hondō dates from the Muromachi period. It is a  National Important Cultural Property

The 7-story pagoda also dates from the same period, burned down during the  Ōei period, and was reconstructed again in 1585. It was burned down again in the battles between Kanemori Nagachika and Anegakoji Yoritsuna and  a 3-story pagoda was built in its place in 1615. This structure also burned down in 1791 and was rebuilt in 1820.

In 1695, when Takayama Castle was destroyed, the Hida Kokubun-ji inherited some of its structures, including the main gate.

Listed cultural properties
 National Important Cultural Property (ICP)s
Hondō, built in mid-Muromachi period
Seated statue of Yakushi Nyōrai, Heian period
Standing statue of Kannon Bosatsu, Heian period
Tachi sword, donated by the Ena clan
Gifu Prefecture ICPs
Seated statue of Amida Nyorai, Kamakura period
Standing statue of Fudō Myō-ō, Kamakura period
 3-story Pagoda, Edo period
Takayama City ICP
Bell tower gate
Plaque on rear gate
National Natural monument
Ginkgo biloba tree, estimated age of 1250 years

Gallery

See also
List of Historic Sites of Japan (Gifu)
provincial temple

References

External links

 
Gifu prefecture official site

Buddhist temples in Gifu Prefecture
Historic Sites of Japan
Takayama, Gifu
Hida Province
Important Cultural Properties of Japan
Wooden buildings and structures in Japan
8th-century establishments in Japan
Nara period
8th-century Buddhist temples
Kōyasan Shingon temples
Religious organizations established in the 8th century